The 1937 Murray State Thoroughbreds football team represented Murray State University in the 1937 college football season. The team won its second Southern Intercollegiate Athletic Association title.

Schedule

References

Murray State
Murray State Racers football seasons
Murray State Thoroughbreds football